Nikolaos "Nikos" Angelopoulos (Greek: Νικόλαος "Νίκος" Αγγελόπουλος; born June 27, 1984) is a Greek professional basketball player for Ionikos Nikaias of the Greek Basket League. He is a 2.05 m (6 ft 8  in) tall power forward-center.

Professional career
Angelopoulos played with the junior teams of Galatsi from 1995 to 2001, before joining moving to Ilysiakos, where he made his pro debut in 2002 in the Greek 2nd Division. During his professional career, Angelopoulos has played with the following clubs: Ilysiakos, Panionios , Aigaleo, Kavala, Rethymno, Koroivos Amaliadas, and Faros Keratsiniou.

National team career
Angelopoulos was a member of the junior national teams of Greece. With Greece's junior national teams, he played at the 2002 FIBA Europe Under-18 Championship, where he won a bronze medal, and at the 2005 FIBA Under-21 World Cup, where he won a silver medal.

External links
FIBA Archive Profile
FIBA Europe Profile
EuroCup Profile
RealGM.com Profile
Eurobasket.com Profile
Draftexpress.com Profile
Greek Basket League Profile 
Faros Profile 

1984 births
Living people
Aigaleo B.C. players
Centers (basketball)
Doxa Lefkadas B.C. players
Ethnikos Piraeus B.C. players
Faros Keratsiniou B.C. players
Greek men's basketball players
Holargos B.C. players
Ilysiakos B.C. players
Kavala B.C. players
Koroivos B.C. players
Panionios B.C. players
Power forwards (basketball)
Rethymno B.C. players
Basketball players from Athens

el:Νίκος Αγγελόπουλος (καλαθοσφαιριστής)